Sunnydale station (also signed as Visitacion Valley) is a light rail station on the Muni Metro T Third Street line, located in the median of Bayshore Boulevard in the Visitacion Valley neighborhood of San Francisco, California. The station opened as the terminus of the T Third Street line on April 7, 2007. It has a single island platform north of Sunnydale Avenue. Tail tracks and a crossover for trains to reverse direction are located south of Sunnydale Avenue.

References

External links 

SFMTA: Bayshore Blvd & Sunnydale Ave
SF Bay Transit (unofficial): Bay Shore Blvd & Sunnydale Ave

Muni Metro stations
Railway stations in the United States opened in 2007